"Touch a New Day" is a song by German singer Lena Meyer-Landrut. It was written and produced by entertainer Stefan Raab for her debut album My Cassette Player (2010). The song was released on 3 August 2010 as the album's second and final single, following Meyer-Landrut's victory at the Eurovision Song Contest 2010.

Music video
The music video for "Touch a New Day" was directed by Marten Persiel. It starts with a couple in their house's front yard, she's watering the grass and he's washing the car. Meyer-Landrut and her friend are behind a bush and Meyer-Landrut calls through the telephone to the house, so the man comes into the house to pick it up and Meyer-Landrut and her friend steal the car. They travel to several places such as France, Spain, they take photos in a photo booth, they have a bath in a lake. Later, they meet a junkman and ask him to remove the upper part of the car, so it becomes a "convertible". In some point they argue for the way to follow but they make up immediately. Finally, they pick up a boy whose roulotte has broken and, in the evening they build a bonfire on a cliff beside the sea.

Formats and track listings

Credits and personnel

Lead vocals – Lena Meyer-Landrut
Producers – Stefan Raab
Music – Stefan Raab

Lyrics –  Stefan Raab
Label: USFO for Universal Deutschland

Charts

References

2010 singles
Lena Meyer-Landrut songs
Songs written by Stefan Raab
Song recordings produced by Stefan Raab
2010 songs